Leptidolon is a genus of plant bug. Species include Leptidolon galbanus.

Synonyms
 Polyozus Eyles & Schuh, 2003

References

Miridae genera